Live in Italy is a live album by punk rock band Sham 69, recorded at the Live in Bo Festival, Italy in summer of 1996 and was released on 1 October 1999 (see 1999 in music).

Track listing 
"Angels with Dirty Faces" - 1:44
"Questions and Answers" - 3:17
"Ulster Boy" - 2:41
"Tell Us The Truth" - 2:23
"Loud Mouth" - 2:17
"Geoffrey Thomas" - 2:43
"Trainspotter" - 2:30
"Studenthead" - 3:35
"14 Years" - 3:07
"Hurry Up Harry" - 2:26
"Money" - 2:08
"Poor Cow" - 2:34
"No Entry" - 2:31
"What Have We Got" - 2:04
"If the Kids Are United" - 3:53
"Blackpool" - 2:27
"Hersham Boys - 3:00
"Borstal Breakout - 3:17

References 

Sham 69 live albums
1999 live albums